Tartans of Scottish Clans is a 1906 British short silent documentary film, directed by George Albert Smith as a test for his newly patented Kinemacolor system, which features a sequence of appropriately labelled Scottish tartan cloths, with an abundance of reds and greens, the two colours used by the system. The film, which was one of Smith's first Kinemacolor experiments, was according to Michael Brooke of BFI Screenonline, "a very simple idea which nonetheless demanded colour in order to convey the necessary information."

References

1906 films
1900s British films
British silent short films
British short documentary films
Films directed by George Albert Smith
Articles containing video clips
Silent films in color
Films set in Scotland
1900s short documentary films